Osiecznica  is a village in Bolesławiec County, Lower Silesian Voivodeship, in south-western Poland. It is the seat of the administrative district (gmina) called Gmina Osiecznica.

The village has a population of 1,000.

From 1975 to 1998 Osiecznica was in Jelenia Góra Voivodeship.

Notable residents
 Abraham Gottlob Werner (1749-1817), German geologist

References

Villages in Bolesławiec County